The Coronation Tap is a ciderhouse, a pub that specialises in serving cider, in the Clifton suburb of the English city of Bristol.

The Coronation Tap, or Cori to regulars, has existed under that name for at least two hundred years. It is at least thirty years older than the Clifton Suspension Bridge and was described in 1806 as "a beerhouse with cottage adjoining".

The most popular drink is the strong Exhibition Cider, served in half pints. The pub is popular with students within the city.

References

External links

Coronation Tap
Coronation Tap
Music venues in Bristol
Buildings and structures in Clifton, Bristol